Lethe Press is an American book publishing company based in Maple Shade, New Jersey. Launched in 2001 by Steve Berman, a writer and a former employee of Giovanni's Room Bookstore in Philadelphia, Pennsylvania, the company was originally launched to publish speculative fiction, primarily LGBT-themed, as well as rereleasing out of print titles from other LGBT publishers. In recent years, with numerous LGBT-oriented publishing companies folding, the company has also expanded its line to include new LGBT-themed non-fiction, poetry and anthology titles.

The company also Tincture, a separate imprint for LGBT people of color. 

In 2012, The Advocate published a piece by Berman criticizing the structure and organization of the Lambda Literary Awards. His criticism included the fact that while many categories have separate awards for gay men and lesbians, the award offers no transparency in its judging and maintains only a single gender-neutral category for both speculative fiction and anthologies. 

In 2020, Writer Beware reported receiving complaints from multiple individuals about Lethe, including contract breaches in the form of unpaid royalties (for both authors and editors) and late royalty payments and statements. Berman addressed these issues on the site.

References

External links
Lethe Press

LGBT book publishing companies
2001 establishments in the United States
Publishing companies established in 2001

American speculative fiction publishers